Clayton Historic District is a historic district in Clayton, New York.  It was originally listed on the National Register of Historic Places in 1985, and later its boundaries were increased in 1997.

It includes the Capt. Simon Johnston House, which is separately listed on the National Register.

References

Historic districts on the National Register of Historic Places in New York (state)
Italianate architecture in New York (state)
Historic districts in Jefferson County, New York
National Register of Historic Places in Jefferson County, New York